Travelzoo is an Internet company that publishes deals from more than 2,000 travel, entertainment and local businesses such as restaurants and spas. It has 28 million members in North America, Europe, and Asia Pacific and 25 offices worldwide.

Companies pay to advertise their deals with Travelzoo, but only those approved by Travelzoo are listed.

History 
In October 1998, Travelzoo founder Ralph Bartel, a former print and television journalist, launched Travelzoo.com with an initial investment of $10,000. In September 2000, Travelzoo published its first Top 20 and e-mailed one million U.S. members. In December 2003, Travelzoo became publicly traded on the NASDAQ SmallCap Market under the ticker symbol "TZOO".

In April 2004, Travelzoo announced that the company's publications had reached over 7 million members, a 75% increase over the 4 million members Travelzoo counted in April 2003.

On March 31, 2006, Travelzoo announced that Forbes.com rated the Travelzoo Web site as one of the best Web sites for travel-related information and travel deals.

Travelzoo acquired Travelzoo Asia Pacific in 2015 to take advantage of the region's increased travel growth.

In October 2015, Travelzoo's CEO Chris Loughlin announced he would step down by the end of the year, to be succeeded temporarily by chairman Holger Bartel.

References

External links 

Companies listed on the Nasdaq
Online marketplaces of the United States
Online travel agencies
Publicly traded companies based in New York City
2003 initial public offerings
American companies established in 1998
American travel websites
Internet properties established in 1998
1998 establishments in the United States
Companies established in 1998
1998 establishments in New York City